St. Agnes’ Loreto Day School, Lucknow, India, is a Catholic Institution under the management of The Lucknow Loreto Educational Society - represented by the sisters of the Institute of the Blessed Virgin Mary (Loreto Sisters). The school is recognized by the Secondary Education Department of Uttar Pradesh (Anglo-Indian Board) and affiliated to the Council for the Indian School Certificate Examinations. It is a school up to senior secondary level. The Principal of the School is Mrs. Debra Bunny.  The school is situated on Station Road, Lucknow, India.It was built in 1904.

The school premises accommodate about 1200 students.  The school has a library, laboratories and a playground. It has an outreach school called "Pushpa Vidyalaya" for the underprivileged on its premises. The school is affiliated to the ICSE council. Students take their exams at the end of February.

The patroness of the school is St. Agnes.

The school has four houses -Charity (red), Hope (green), Joy (blue)and Peace (yellow). House members participate in events all through the year in inter house competitions including elocution, singing, debates, quizzes, basketball, throw ball, kho-kho and other sports.

The school participates in the ASISC meets held every year. We have won Junior and senior basketball tournaments, secured first position in shotput, runner up in 3.5 km marathons and won various medals for English and Science Olympiad.
 
The Literary Club from the School organizes the "Literary Fest" known as "Boulevard" annually. The fest receives participation from schools across the city for various competitions held throughout the day.
Notable alumnae of the School include - 
Jaya Bhattacharya (TV actress ) :award-winning writer Akansha Tiwari (of Amdavad mein Famous fame)

The crest
See. The crest is surmounted by the words "Maria Regina Angelorum" which indicates the patronage of Our Lady, Queen of Angels. The emblem's symbols mean:
 The Cross - sign of salvation,
 The Sacred Heart - source of the love of Jesus for each person,
 The heart of Mary - our human model and inspiration,
 The anchor - a symbol of hope.

This symbolism is summed up in the final scroll: "Cruci dum Spiro fido" - "Throughout my life, I shall place my hope in the cross".

Notes

External links
Home Page

Sisters of Loreto schools
Catholic schools in India
Girls' schools in Uttar Pradesh
Christian schools in Uttar Pradesh
Schools in Lucknow
Educational institutions established in 1904
1904 establishments in India